Athimugam is a village in the Shoolagiri taluk of Krishnagiri district, Tamil Nadu, India.

Etymology 
Athimugam is also called "Hasthimugam" meaning "elephant face", after a local Hindu temple deity.

Location 
Athimugam township is located near the border of Tamil Nadu state and Karnataka state in the central part of southern India. The nearest service township is Hosur, approximately 15 km to the west. Athimugam village is on the Berigai-Shoolagiri road (422).

Services  
Athimugam is a small service centre for the local farming community. It has a bus service, postal service, bank, schools and medical clinics. Petrol and groceries are available. There are a number of small temples in and around the village.

Villages in Krishnagiri district

*